The Little Scioto River is a tributary of the Scioto River,  long, in central Ohio in the United States.

The Little Scioto rises south of Bucyrus in Crawford County, and flows generally southwestwardly into Marion County, passing to the west of the city of Marion.  It flows into the Scioto River at Green Camp.

Superfund site
The river was placed on the Environmental Protection Agency's National Priorities List on September 23, 2009.  The river had been contaminated by the nearby Baker Wood Creosoting facility in Marion, Ohio.  Cleanup at the site began in 2006, but designating the river a Superfund site in 2009 allowed the EPA to force the responsible parties to pay for the cleanup.

Discharge 
A USGS stream gauge on the river near Marion recorded a mean annual discharge of  during water years 1926-1935.

See also
List of rivers of Ohio
List of Superfund sites in Ohio

References

Rivers of Ohio
Rivers of Crawford County, Ohio
Rivers of Marion County, Ohio
Superfund sites in Ohio